This is a list of electoral division results for the 2019 Australian federal election in the state of Tasmania.

Overall results

Results by division

Bass

Braddon

Clark

Franklin

Lyons

References

2019 Australian federal election
Tasmania 2019